Brambanan Station (BBN) also known as Prambanan Station, is a class I railway station located in Kebondalem Kidul, Prambanan, Klaten Regency, The station is included in the Operational Area VI Yogyakarta at an altitude of +146 meters. The station is the westernmost railway station in Klaten Regency. The station road connects this station with the Solo-Yogyakarta highway. Currently this station serves loading and unloading of cement and since 26 June 2016 also serves passengers services for Prambanan Express.

Although the surrounding area is known as Prambanan, the name of this station according to data from the Nederlandsch-Indische Spoorweg Maatschappij (NIS) is written as Brambanan and has not changed until now.

Building and layout
Initially, this station probably had four railway tracks with line 1 being a straight line. Since the operation of the Yogyakarta-Solo partial double track as the Srowot-Ketandan segment in 2001 and completed as the Brambanan-Delanggu segment on 15 December 2003, line 2 of this station was made into as a straight line from Solo. As of 2005–2006 and fully completed in 2007, line 1 of this station has completely become a straight line towards Yogyakarta. Line 4 is used as a storage rail for freight train parking.

The old station building, which was previously similar to Srowot Station and a legacy of the DKA (Djawatan Kereta Api), collapsed in the 2006 Yogyakarta earthquake. As its replacement, the current station building was built by the Directorate General of Railways.

This station is on the Prambanan plain, so it is located close to various important ancient buildings, such as Prambanan Temple, Sewu Temple, Ratu Boko Complex, Sojiwan Temple, and Plaosan Temple; apart from other smaller temples.

To the west of this station, before Maguwo Station, there was Kalasan Station which has been inactive since the double tracks Kutoarjo-Solo Balapan  operates.

To support double tracks operations, the mechanical signaling system at this station was replaced with an artificial electric signaling system PT Len Industri (Persero) which had been installed since 2013 and only started operation on 1 October 2018.

Since 2020 this station has also been equipped with Overhead catenary as part of the line electrification Yogyakarta-Solo Balapan railway station

Services
The following is a list of train services at the Brambanan Station.

Passenger services

Freight services
Indocement, the destination of
 via --
 via --

References

External links

Klaten Regency
Railway stations in Central Java
Railway stations opened in 1872